Quelossim is a village in Mormugao taluka, South Goa, India. This village was known as Kardalipura in ancient times and had a beautiful temple dedicated to the Mother-Goddess Shri Shantadurga and Shri Kavale Math which was shifted to Kavale 450 years ago when the Portuguese demolished the shrine as a part of the inquisition. The original temple was built by a Goud Saraswat Brahman trader Anu Shenvi Mone, but was destroyed during the religious persecution period around 1566 AD. Today the exact location can be accessed from NH66 via Kesarval Spring en route to Rassaim or Loutolim, where one can see a few architectural ruins, in the form of the original temple lake. A small modern day shrine is seen under a huge banyan tree, at the end of this route property owned and maintained by Shree Shantadurga Saunsthan, Kavale and this area is protected by the Directorate of Archives and Archaeology, Government of Goa.

The Konkani poet Krishnadas Shama hailed from this village. Quelossim was also known by names Kelshi and Keloshi with the villagers being called as Keloshikars.

References

Villages in South Goa district